"Strong As Steel" is the name of a 1987 hit single by British pop group Five Star, the second release from their third album, Between The Lines. The single peaked at No. 16 in the UK.

The song was written by songwriter Diane Warren, who has also written hit songs for Cher, Gloria Estefan, Tina Turner, Celine Dion, Tina Arena and Michael Bolton.

Track listings
7" single and 7" posterbag
 "Strong As Steel" (Edit)
 "The Man"

12" single PT41566 and cassette single
 "Strong As Steel" (Album Version)
 "The Man"
 "Can't Wait Another Minute" (M&M Groove Remix) 05:15

2nd 12" single PT41566(R)
 "Strong As Steel" (Edit)
 "The Man"
 "The Five Star Hit Mix", 11:52 (Disco Mix Club megamix featuring "Can't Wait Another Minute", "Let Me Be the One", "All Fall Down", "Whenever You're Ready", "Find The Time", "If I Say Yes", "R.S.V.P.", "Love Take Over", "The Slightest Touch"). 

All tracks available on the remastered versions of either the 2012 'Between The Lines' album, the 2013 'The Remix Anthology (The Remixes 1984-1991)' or the 2018 'Luxury - The Definitive Anthology 1984-1991' boxset.

Tina Arena version

Australian singer Tina Arena released her version of the song as a single from her first album Strong as Steel (1990).

Charts

Other cover versions 
American singer Gregory Abbott covered the song for the soundtrack of the 1989 film Tap.
American R&B singer Gladys Knight covered the song in 1990, which was featured in the soundtrack for the 1990 film Ghost Dad, starring Bill Cosby and Kimberly Russell.
In 1997, Diane Warren released a promotional compilation of songs written by her titled A Passion for Music. Included on the track list is the original demo of the song, sung by Jeff Pescetto.

References 

1987 songs
1987 singles
1990 singles
Five Star songs
Songs written by Diane Warren
Tina Arena songs
RCA Records singles